A sculptural pairing of  the tyrannicides Harmodius and Aristogeiton was well known in the ancient world in two major versions but survives only in Roman marble copies.  The lovers Harmodius and Aristogeiton were Athenian heroes whose act of daring in 514 BC opened the way for Athenian democracy.

History
A first version that was commissioned from the sculptor Antenor after the establishment of Athenian democracy and erected in the Agora was stolen by the Persians when they occupied Athens in 480 during the Persian Wars and removed to Susa. Though it was returned to Athens by Alexander the Great (according to Alexander's historian Arrian) or by Seleucus I (according to the Roman writer Valerius Maximus), or again by Antiochus according to Pausanias (1.8.5), it never attracted copyists and is now lost.
 
To replace the stolen first version, the Athenians commissioned Kritios and Nesiotes to produce a new statue, which was set up in 477/76 BC, according to the inscribed Parian Chronicle.  Both pairs stood side-by-side in the Agora as late as the 2nd century AD when Pausanias noted them there. The pair by Kritios and Nesiotes too are now lost, but unlike Antenor's they were extensively copied in Hellenistic and Roman times. The best surviving of those copies may be seen in the National Archaeological Museum in Naples.

Description
In the Neo-Attic style that revived the Severe style of the original bronzes, it shows idealized portraits of the two heroes: a clean-shaven Harmodius, thrusting a sword forward in his upraised right hand, another sword in his left hand; and Aristogeiton, also brandishing a sword, with a chlamys, or cape, draped over his left shoulder. Of the four swords only the hilts are left. The head of Aristogeiton, as well as the left hand and right arm, are not original. 

A weathered marble head of Harmodius, once of fine workmanship, conserved at the Metropolitan Museum of Art, with the remains of a strut support on the crown of the head, suggested to Gisela Richter a restoration of the right arm of Harmodius (of which both are missing and restored in the Neapolitan sculpture), reaching backwards, ready for a downward-slashing stroke.

Notes

Further reading
 Taylor, Michael W. The Tyrant Slayers: The Heroic Image in Fifth Century B.C. Athenian Art and Politics 2nd ed. 1991.
Sture Brunnsåker, The Tyrant-Slayers of Kritios and Nesiotes. A critical study of the sources and restorations (Skrifter utgivna av Svenska institutet i Athen, 4°, 17), Stockholm 1971. . . See record at WorldCat: http://www.worldcat.org/oclc/715118964

5th-century BC Greek sculptures
Collections of the National Archaeological Museum, Naples
Farnese Collection
Roman copies of 5th-century BC Greek sculptures
Art of ancient Attica
Stolen works of art